Below are the rosters for the UNCAF Nations Cup 1999 tournament in San José, Costa Rica, from March 17 to March 28, 1999.

Group A

Head coach:  Manuel Bilches

Head coach:  Francisco Maturana

Head coach:  Ramón Maradiaga

Group B

Head coach:  Mario Peres Ulibarri

Head coach:  Benjamín Monterroso

Head coach:  Mauricio Cruz

References
RSSSF Archive

Copa Centroamericana squads
squads